The branches of microbiology can be classified into pure and applied sciences. Microbiology can be also classified based on taxonomy, in the cases of bacteriology, mycology, protozoology, and phycology. There is considerable overlap between the specific branches of microbiology with each other and with other disciplines, and certain aspects of these branches can extend beyond the traditional scope of microbiology
In general the field of microbiology can be divided in the more fundamental branch (pure microbiology) and the applied microbiology (biotechnology). In the more fundamental field the organisms are studied as the subject itself on a deeper (theoretical) level.
Applied microbiology refers to the fields where the micro-organisms are applied in certain processes such as brewing or fermentation. The organisms itself are often not studied as such, but applied to sustain certain processes.

Pure microbiology

 Bacteriology: the study of bacteria
 Mycology: the study of fungi
 Protozoology: the study of protozoa
 Phycology/algology: the study of algae
 Parasitology: the study of parasites
 Immunology: the study of the immune system
 Virology: the study of viruses
 Nematology: the study of nematodes
 Microbial cytology: the study of microscopic and submicroscopic details of microorganisms
 Microbial physiology: the study of how the microbial cell functions biochemically. Includes the study of microbial growth, microbial metabolism and microbial cell structure
 Microbial pathogenesis: the study of pathogens which happen to be microbes
 Microbial ecology: the relationship between microorganisms and their environment
 Microbial genetics: the study of how genes are organized and regulated in microbes in relation to their cellular functions Closely related to the field of molecular biology
 Cellular microbiology: a discipline bridging microbiology and cell biology
 Evolutionary microbiology: the study of the evolution of microbes. This field can be subdivided into:
 Microbial taxonomy: the naming and classification of microorganisms
 Bacterial taxonomy: the naming and classification of bacteria
 Microbial systematics: the study of the diversity and genetic relationship of microorganisms
 Microbial phylogenetics: the study of the manner in which various groups of microorganisms are genetically related
 Bacterial phylodynamics: the study of immunology, epidemiology, and phylogenetics of bacterial pathogens to better understand their evolutionary role
 Viral phylodynamics: the study of how epidemiological, immunological, and evolutionary processes act and potentially interact to shape viral phylogenies
 Generation microbiology: the study of those microorganisms that have the same characters as their parents
 Systems microbiology: a discipline bridging systems biology and microbiology.
 Molecular microbiology: the study of the molecular principles of the physiological processes in microorganisms

Other

 Astro microbiology: the study of microorganisms in outer space
 Biological agent: the study of those microorganisms which are being used in weapon industries.
 Nano microbiology: the study of those microscopic organisms on nano level.
 Predictive microbiology: the quantification of relations between controlling factors in foods and responses of pathogenic and spoilage microorganisms using mathematical modelling

Applied microbiology
 
 Medical microbiology: the study of the pathogenic microbes and the role of microbes in human illness. Includes the study of microbial pathogenesis and epidemiology and is related to the study of disease pathology and immunology. This area of microbiology also covers the study of human microbiota, cancer, and the tumor microenvironment.
 Pharmaceutical microbiology: the study of microorganisms that are related to the production of antibiotics, enzymes, vitamins, vaccines, and other pharmaceutical products and that cause pharmaceutical contamination and spoil.
 Industrial microbiology: the exploitation of microbes for use in industrial processes. Examples include industrial fermentation and wastewater treatment. Closely linked to the biotechnology industry. This field also includes brewing, an important application of microbiology.
 Microbial biotechnology: the manipulation of microorganisms at the genetic and molecular level to generate useful products.
 Food microbiology: the study of microorganisms causing food spoilage and foodborne illness. Using microorganisms to produce foods, for example by fermentation.
 Agricultural microbiology: the study of agriculturally relevant microorganisms. This field can be further classified into the following:
 Plant microbiology and Plant pathology: The study of the interactions between microorganisms and plants and plant pathogens.
 Soil microbiology: the study of those microorganisms that are found in soil.
 Veterinary microbiology: the study of the role of microbes in veterinary medicine or animal taxonomy.
 Environmental microbiology: the study of the function and diversity of microbes in their natural environments. This involves the characterization of key bacterial habitats such as the rhizosphere and phyllosphere, soil and groundwater ecosystems, open oceans or extreme environments (extremophiles). This field includes other branches of microbiology such as:
 Microbial ecology
 Microbially mediated nutrient cycling
 Geomicrobiology
 Microbial diversity
 Bioremediation: use of micro-organisms to clean air, water and soils.
 Water microbiology (or aquatic microbiology): The study of those microorganisms that are found in water.
 Aeromicrobiology (or air microbiology): The study of airborne microorganisms.
Biotechnology: related to recombinant DNA technology or genetic engineering.

References

Microbiology